The 1970 Iowa State Senate elections took place as part of the biennial 1970 United States elections. Iowa voters elected state senators in 27 of the state senate's 50 districts. Due to redistricting following the amending of the Iowa Constitution in 1968 mandating single-member districts, the Iowa Senate downsized from 61 to 50 members following the 1970 election. State senators typically serve four-year terms in the Iowa State Senate.

The Iowa General Assembly provides statewide maps of each district. To compare the effect of the 1968 redistricting process on the location of each district, contrast the previous map with the map used for 1970 elections.

The primary election on June 2, 1970 determined which candidates appeared on the November 3, 1970 general election ballot. Primary election results can be obtained here. General election results can be obtained here.

Following the previous election, Republicans had control of the Iowa state Senate with 45 seats to Democrats' 16 seats. In June 1969, a special election in district 18 resulted in Sen. Orr flipping a seat in favor of the Democrats. Therefore, on election day in November 1970, Republicans controlled 44 seats and Democrats had 17.

To claim control of the chamber from Republicans, the Democrats needed to net 9 Senate seats.

Republicans maintained control of the Iowa State Senate following the 1970 general election with the balance of power shifting to Republicans holding 38 seats and Democrats having 12 seats (a net loss of 6 seats for Republicans and loss of 5 seats for the Democrats).

Summary of Results
The Iowa Constitution was amended in 1968 and required transitioning to single-member districts. Following the 1970 elections, the total number of state Senators fell from 61 to 50 members. 27 districts were up for election in 1970. 
An asterisk (*) after a Senator's name indicates they were an incumbent in a new district number due to redistricting. 
Italicized district numbers indicate holdover Senators who were not up for election in 1970, but were shifted to new district numbers in the middle of their terms. These districts did not hold elections in 1970.

Source:

Detailed Results
Reminder: A change to the Iowa Constitution required transitioning to all single-member districts from 1970 onward.

Note: If a district does not list a primary, then that district did not have a competitive primary (i.e., there may have only been one candidate file for that district).

District 6

District 12

District 13

District 14

District 16

District 17

District 19

District 21

District 22

Sen. Weimer did not take his seat in district 22 after winning re-election.

District 23

District 24

District 25

District 26

District 27

District 29

District 31

District 33

District 34

District 36

District 37

District 38

District 41

District 43

District 45

District 46

District 49

District 50

See also
 United States elections, 1970
 United States House of Representatives elections in Iowa, 1970
 Elections in Iowa

References

1970 Iowa elections
Iowa Senate elections
Iowa State Senate